Sujit Minchekar is an Indian politician from Kolhapur district, Maharashtra. He is currently the Member of Legislative Assembly from Hatkanangale Vidhan Sabha constituency of Kolhapur, Maharashtra, India as a member of Shiv Sena. He has been elected for two consecutive terms in the Maharashtra Legislative Assembly for 2009 & 2014.

Positions held
 2009: Elected to Maharashtra Legislative Assembly (1st term)
 2014: Re-Elected to Maharashtra Legislative Assembly (2nd term)

References

External links
 Shiv Sena Home Page
  आमदार क्षीरसागर, मिणचेकर यांचे जंगी स्वागत 

Living people
People from Kolhapur district
Maharashtra MLAs 2009–2014
Maharashtra MLAs 2014–2019
Shiv Sena politicians
Marathi politicians
Year of birth missing (living people)